The 1941 Volta a Catalunya was the 21st edition of the Volta a Catalunya cycle race and was held from 6 to 12 September 1941. The race started and finished in Barcelona. The race was won by Antonio Andrés.

Route and stages

General classification

References

1941
Volta
1941 in Spanish road cycling
September 1941 sports events